Esperanza is a village located along the George Price Highway in Cayo District, Belize. It lies approximately four kilometers northeast of San Ignacio. According to the 2010 census, Esperanza has a population of 1,262 people in 286 households.

References 

Populated places in Cayo District
Cayo North East